The men's 120 yards hurdles event at the 1938 British Empire Games was held on 12 February at the Sydney Cricket Ground in Sydney, Australia.

Medalists

Results

Heats
Qualification: First 3 in each heat (Q) qualify directly for the final.

Final

References

Athletics at the 1938 British Empire Games
1938